Dvin may refer to:
Dvin (ancient city), an ancient city and one of the historic capitals of Armenia
Dvin, Armenia, a modern village in Armenia named after the nearby ancient city of Dvin
Verin Dvin, a village in the Ararat Province of Armenia
FC Dvin Artashat, a dissolved Armenian football club from Artashat (1982–1999)